The 1982–83 Hong Kong First Division League season was the 72nd since its establishment.

League table

References
 1982–83 Hong Kong First Division (RSSSF)

Hong
Hong Kong First Division League seasons
1982–83 in Hong Kong football